Northavon was, from 1983 until 2010, a constituency represented in the House of Commons of the Parliament of the United Kingdom. It elected one Member of Parliament (MP) by the first past the post system of election.

History
The constituency was established in 1983. Held initially by the Conservative Party, it was gained narrowly by the Liberal Democrats in 1997. The Almanac of British Politics described it as "one of the most unexpected Liberal Democrat gains" of the 1997 election and speculated that a significant amount of tactical voting had benefitted the party in this seat. The seat then swung heavily in the Liberal Democrats favour in 2001 and was held again by the party in 2005.

Boundaries
1983–1997: The District of Northavon wards of Almondsbury, Alveston, Badminton, Charfield, Chipping Sodbury, Dodington North, Frampton Cotterell Central, Frampton Cotterell East, Frampton Cotterell West, Hawkesbury, Iron Acton, Marshfield, Oldbury-on-Severn, Olveston, Patchway Callicroft, Patchway Coniston, Patchway Stoke Lodge, Pilning and Severn Beach, Pucklechurch, Thornbury North, Thornbury South, Westerleigh Stanshawes, Westerleigh and Coalpit Heath, Wick and Abson, Wickwar, Winterbourne, Winterbourne Down and Hambrook, Winterbourne Frenchay, Yate Central, Yate North, Yate South, and Yate West.

1997–2010: The District of Northavon wards of Almondsbury, Alveston, Badminton, Charfield, Chipping Sodbury, Dodington North, Frampton Cotterell Central, Frampton Cotterell East, Frampton Cotterell West, Hawkesbury, Iron Acton, Marshfield, Oldbury-on-Severn, Olveston, Pilning and Severn Beach, Pucklechurch, Thornbury North, Thornbury South, Westerleigh and Coalpit Heath, Wick and Abson, Wickwar, Winterbourne, Winterbourne Down and Hambrook, Winterbourne Frenchay, Yate Central, Yate North, Yate South, Yate Stanshawes, and Yate West.

Northavon covered the same area as the former Northavon district (the more rural part of the current South Gloucestershire district) at its creation, but some of the constituency moved to Bristol North West with the boundary review implemented in 1997. The constituency included suburban and industrial areas on the outskirts of Bristol and several dormitory towns and small villages.

Following the review by the Boundary Commission for England of parliamentary representation in the former Avon county, taking effect at the 2010 general election, the Northavon seat has been abolished.  It has been largely replaced by the Thornbury and Yate seat, but also by Filton and Bradley Stoke.

Members of Parliament

Elections

Elections in the 2000s

Elections in the 1990s

Elections in the 1980s

See also
List of parliamentary constituencies in Avon

Notes and references

Parliamentary constituencies in South West England (historic)
Constituencies of the Parliament of the United Kingdom established in 1983
Constituencies of the Parliament of the United Kingdom disestablished in 2010
Politics of South Gloucestershire District